Alexander Ivanovich Dubrovin (1855, Kungur – unknown) was a Russian Empire right wing politician, a leader of the Union of the Russian People (URP).

Biography 
A trained doctor, Dubrovin gave up his practice to concentrate on opposing what he saw as creeping liberalism in the Russian aristocracy, turning his own movement, the Russian Assembly, over to the newly formed URP in 1905, when he was appointed head of the new group's directorate. Both anti-Semitic and anti-Masonic he believed in the Zhidomasonstvo (Judeo-Masonic) conspiracy and took the lead in organising the pogroms of the Black Hundreds.

Gaining a popular following amongst the peasants, petite bourgeoisie and lumpenproletariat for his demagogy, Dubrovin sat in the State Duma of the Russian Empire despite being a firm believer in absolutism and before organising a failed boycott of the Third Duma in 1907. Closely involved in the trial of Menahem Mendel Beilis, as later described in Bernard Malamud's novel The Fixer, Dubrovin himself fell foul of the law when his tendency towards violence saw him indicted for the murder of a fellow Duma member.

In the URP, Dubrovin was the leader of an extreme faction based around the Russkoe znamya newspaper and in 1910, that became the base of his support when the majority faction of the URP fell under Nikolai Markov. With Dubrovin somewhat lacking in charisma and seen as somewhat unbalanced, his faction fell into insignificance.

Death controversy 
According to Philip Rees Dubrovin was shot in 1918 for his activities against the October Revolution. A number of other sources however place Dubrovin alive after this date and his actual date of death remains unresolved. On October 21, 1920 Dubrovin was arrested in Moscow by Cheka. He was charged as an organizer of pogroms, murders etc. in 1905—1917 when he was the chairman of URP. In their entirety these corpus delicti (components of crime) were qualified under the Criminal Code Article "the counter-revolutionary activity".

According to multiple Russian sources, since December 12, 1917, Dubrovin lived in Moscow and worked as a doctor in the 1st Lefortovo Soviet ambulance station. He was arrested by the All-Russian Extraordinary Commission (Cheka) on October 21, 1920. The documents of the case indicate that Dubrovin “from 1905 to 1917 was the chairman of the "Union of the Russian People", which fought against the liberation movement in Russia. On October 30, 1920, the accusation of counter-revolution was added to this and Dubrovin was personally interrogated members of the Presidium of the Cheka Vyacheslav Menzhinsky, Martin Latsis and secretary B.M. Futoryan.

On November 1, 1920, the Special Department of the Cheka issued a conclusion that “the charge of Dr. Dubrovin Alexander Ivanovich in the organization before the revolution, is of murders, pogroms, insinuations, forgeries, striving with all their activities to strangle the liberation of Russia is proven" and the case was transferred to the Collegium of the Cheka with the proposal "the chairman of the Union of the Russian People AI Dubrovin - to be shot”. On December 29, 1920 he was sentenced to be shot by the Presidium of the Cheka by being "convicted of organizing murders and pogroms". However the exact date of execution is not known.

Dubrovin’s files at FSB archives keep two consecutive death sentences dated December 29, 1920 and April 21, 1921 which indicates that at least one time Dubrovin’s appeal for amnesty was satisfied. No documental traces of the actual implementation of this sentence were found. Meanwhile, according to the Small Soviet Encyclopedia published in 1929 Dubrovin was still alive by that date.

See also 
 List of people who disappeared

Sources

References

1855 births
1920s missing person cases
20th-century deaths
Anti-Masonry
Conspiracy theorists from the Russian Empire
Eastern Orthodox conspiracy theorists
Members of the Russian Assembly
Members of the Union of the Russian People
Missing person cases in Russia
People from Kungur
People from Kungursky Uyezd
Physicians from the Russian Empire
S.M. Kirov Military Medical Academy alumni